Rohit Bal is an Indian fashion designer. He designs for both men and women.

Early life 
Rohit Bal was born in the city of Srinagar in the  Jammu and Kashmir state of India on 8 May 1961 into a Kashmiri Pandit family. Bal received his Bachelor's degree in History from St. Stephens College, University of Delhi. He went on to study fashion at the National Institute of Fashion Technology in Delhi.

Career
Rohit Bal started his career with his brother Rajiv Bal in New Delhi in 1986 the Company Orchid Oversea Pvt.Ltd, and started his own first independent collection in 1990.

Bal was also chosen by the Khadi Gram Udyog, the largest handloom textile operation in Panchkula, to work with them.

Bal has designed costumes for the popular Indian game show Kaun Banega Crorepati.

Bal opened a flagship store in Delhi, as well as stores in Mumbai, Bangalore, Ahmedabad, Kolkata and Chennai. Bal has also ventured into designing jewellery.
He is best known for his use of lotus and peacock motifs. He frequently uses rich fabrics like velvet, brocade and his designs are elaborate, inspired by Indian grandeur and royalty.

He has an international client base that includes Cindy Crawford, Pamela Anderson and Uma Thurman among various Indian celebrities. He is also an ambassador for Omega watches.

Accolades 
Bal won the 'Designer of the Year' award at the Indian Fashion Awards in 2006. He has also won 'Designer of the Year' at the Kingfisher Fashion Achievement Awards in 2001. He was awarded as the Lakme Grand Finale Designer for 2012. In 2020, he was recognized as "Iconic Fashion Designer of the country" by the jury of the Rajnigandha Pearls India Fashion Awards.

References

External links

 
 
 

1967 births
Living people
Kashmiri people
Indian Hindus
Kashmiri Hindus
Kashmiri Pandits
Kashmiri Brahmins
Indian people of Kashmiri descent
Indian fashion designers
Indian male fashion designers
People from Srinagar
People of Kashmir region
People from Jammu and Kashmir
People from Delhi
Artists from Delhi
St. Stephen's College, Delhi alumni
Delhi University alumni
National Institute of Fashion Technology alumni
Indian LGBT artists
LGBT fashion designers
Fashion labels from India